The 2023 K League 1, also known as the Hana 1Q K League 1 for sponsorship reasons, is the 41st season of the top division of professional football in South Korea since its establishment in 1983 as the K League, and the sixth season under its current name, the K League 1. Ulsan Hyundai FC are the defending champions. The 2023 season will kick off at 25 February 2023.

The 2023 season will be divided into two parts. First, there will be 33 Regular Rounds in which 12 teams play a round robin with 3 rounds (Rounds 1–33). Then there will be a Final A and Final B, each with 6 teams divided based on regular round performance, with each final being a round robin (Rounds 34–38).

Teams
A total of twelve teams are participating in the 2023 edition of K League 1.

Changes
Gwangju FC (promoted after a one-year absence) and Daejeon Hana Citizen (promoted after a seven-year absence) were promoted from the 2022 K League 2. Gimcheon Sangmu (relegated after one year in the top flight) and Seongnam FC (relegated after four years in the top flight) were relegated to 2023 K League 2.

Participating teams by province
The following twelve clubs will compete in the K League 1 during the 2023 season.

Stadiums

Foreign players
Restricting the number of foreign players strictly to six per team, including a slot for a player from the Asian Football Confederation countries. A team could use five foreign players on the field each game, including at least one player from the AFC confederation.  An Byong-jun, playing for Suwon Samsung Bluewings, was deemed to be a native player. 
The name in bold indicates that the player was registered during the mid-season transfer window.

League table

Positions by matchday

Round 1–33

Round 34–38

Results table

Matches 1–22 
Teams play each other twice, once at home, once away.

Matches 23–33 
Teams will play each other once.

Final Round Matches 34–38 
Teams will play each other once.

Final A

Final B

Fixtures and results 
The fixtures of 2023 season of K League 1 have been released.

Matchday 1

Matchday 2

Matchday 3

Matchday 4

Matchday 5

Matchday 6

Matchday 7

Matchday 8

Matchday 9

Matchday 10

Matchday 11

Matchday 12

Matchday 13

Matchday 14

Matchday 15

Matchday 16

Matchday 17

Matchday 18

Matchday 19

Matchday 20

Matchday 21

Matchday 22

Matchday 23

Matchday 24

Matchday 25

Matchday 26

Matchday 27

Matchday 28

Matchday 29

Matchday 30

Matchday 31

Matchday 32

Matchday 33

Final Round

Matchday 34

Matchday 35

Matchday 36

Matchday 37

Matchday 38

Relegation play-offs
The Promotion-relegation playoffs will be contested between the 2nd placed team in the K League 2 playoff and the 11th placed team in the K League 1, and between the winners of K League 2 playoff and the 10th placed team in the K League 1. The winners will secure a place in the 2023 K League 1.

First leg

Second leg

Season statistics

Goals

Assists

Awards

Most Valuable Player of the Round

Monthly Awards

Season Awards

Notes

See also
 2023 K League 2

References

K League 1 seasons
South Korea
2023 in South Korean football